Isla Grande de Tierra del Fuego (English: Big Island of the Land of Fire) also formerly Isla de Xátiva is an island near the southern tip of South America from which it is separated by the Strait of Magellan. The western portion (61.4%) of the island is in Chile (Province of Tierra del Fuego and Antártica Chilena Province), while the eastern portion (38.6%) is in Argentina (Tierra del Fuego Province). It forms the major landmass in an extended group of islands or archipelago also known as Tierra del Fuego.

Its two biggest towns are Ushuaia and Río Grande, both in Argentina. Other towns are Tolhuin, Porvenir, Camerón, and Cerro Sombrero. The Argentine side, Tierra del Fuego Province, has 127,205 inhabitants (2010), whereas the Chilean side, even though its area is significantly larger, has only 6,656 (2012), almost all located in the Tierra del Fuego Province.

Its highest point is unofficially named Monte Shipton, in Chile. Nearby Mount Darwin was previously thought to be the tallest mountain on the island for a long time, but is just less than a hundred metres shorter. The northern parts of the island have oil deposits; Cerro Sombrero in Chile is the main extraction centre in the island.

On 17 December 1949, an earthquake occurred in the Chilean portion, near the Argentine border. Recorded as 7.8 on the  moment magnitude scale, it was the most powerful ever recorded in the south of Argentina.

Geography

Tierra del Fuego is bounded on the east by the South Atlantic, on the north by the Magellan Straits and on the south and west by a series of fjords and channels linked to the Pacific Ocean. One of the few prominent features of the northeast shore is San Sebastián Bay. To the south the island is bounded by the Beagle Channel, south of which lie a series of islands included in Chilean territory. To the west the island has two major inlets, Inútil Bay and Almirantazgo Fjord. The latter lies along the Magallanes–Fagnano Fault and is a continuation of the Cami Lake depression in southern Tierra del Fuego.

The southwest part of the island, between the Almirantazgo Fjord and the Beagle Channel and extending west to end at Brecknock Peninsula on the Pacific Ocean, is mountainous with a heavily indented coastline, dominated by the Cordillera Darwin. Most of this part of the island is included in the Alberto de Agostini National Park of Chile.

History

The earliest human settlement occurred more than 10,000 years ago, as people migrated from the mainland, perhaps under pressure from competitors. The Yaghan people were some of the earliest known humans settling in Tierra del Fuego. Certain archeological sites at locations such as Navarino Island, within the islands of Tierra del Fuego, have yielded artifacts and evidence of their culture from the Megalithic era.

The name Tierra del Fuego derives from Portuguese explorer Ferdinand Magellan, who was the first European to visit these lands in 1520, on his voyage to the Philippines from Spain. He believed he was seeing the many fires (fuego in Spanish) of the Amerindians, which were visible from the sea and that the "Indians" were waiting in the forests to ambush his armada. These were fires lit by the Yamana Indians who lived in the northern part of the island, to ward off the low temperatures in the area. Originally called the "Land of Smoke," it was later changed to the more exciting "Land of Fire."

The British commander Robert Fitzroy, on his first voyage aboard  in 1830, captured four native Fuegians after they stole a boat from his ship. The men included Orundellico, later named Jemmy Button by his crew. Fitzroy taught them English and took them with him on his return to England, where he took them to Court to meet the King and Queen in London. They became early celebrities. The surviving three were returned to Tierra del Fuego on the second voyage of Beagle, which included the naturalist Charles Darwin, who made extensive notes about his visit to the islands.

In July 1881 the island was divided between Argentina and Chile, each of which had previously claimed it entirely.

The 1949 Tierra del Fuego earthquake took place on 17 December 1949, at 06:53:30. It recorded magnitude 7.8 in the Richter scale. Its epicenter was located in the east of the Chilean Tierra del Fuego Province, close to the Argentine border, at a depth of 30 km (19 mi).

This was the most powerful earthquake ever recorded in the south of Argentina. It was felt with grade VIII in the Mercalli intensity scale, and affected the settlements and some others like Punta Arenas and Río Gallegos. Due to low population density, damage was limited.

Climate
The northeast is characterized by strong winds and little precipitation, while in the south and west it is very windy, foggy, and wet most of the year, with precipitation levels averaging  a year. Places in the world with comparable climates are the Aleutian Islands, Iceland, Kuril Islands, Campbell Island, the Kerguelen Islands, the Scottish Highlands, and coastal areas of Norway.

In August 1995 the island was hit by an event of intense winds, cold and snowfall known as the White Earthquake. This caused the ferry service across Primera Angostura to be suspended, as well as the international road to Río Gallegos to be closed. In Timaukel alone the mayor reported that 150 thousand sheep and 6,500 heads of cattle were threatened by the event.

Flora

Only 30% of the islands have forests, which are classified as Magellanic subpolar; the northeast is made up by steppe and cool semidesert.

There are six species of tree found in Tierra del Fuego: Canelo or Winter's Bark (Drimys winteri), Maytenus magellanica, Pilgerodendron uviferum the southernmost conifer in the world, and three kinds of southern beech; Nothofagus antarctica, Nothofagus pumilio and the evergreen Nothofagus betuloides. Edible fruits grow in open spaces in these forests, such as beach strawberry (Fragaria chiloensis var. chiloensis forma chiloensis) and calafate (Berberis buxifolia), which have been collected by Indians and residents alike. These forests are unique in the world for having developed in a climate with such cold summers. Tree cover extends very close to the southernmost tip of South America. Winds are so strong that trees in wind-exposed areas grow twisted by the force of winds, and people call the trees "flag-trees" for the shape that they need to take in the fight with the wind. Tree vegetation extends as far south as the Isla de los Estados, Navarino Island and the north of Hoste Island. At altitudes above, dwarf nothofagus communities are found. Going further south, Wollaston Islands and the south of Hoste Island are covered by subantarctic tundra.

The forests of Tierra del Fuego have been a source of trees that have been planted abroad in places with a similar climate but that were devoid of trees, such as the Faroe Islands and nearby archipelagos. Most species were gathered from the coldest places in Tierra del Fuego bordering the tundra. This resulted in positive changes, as the heavy winds and cool summers in the Faroe Islands had not formerly allowed the growth of trees from other regions in the world. In the Faroe Islands, the imported trees are used ornamentally, as curtains against wind, and for fighting erosion caused by storms and grazing.

Economy

The main industries are oil, natural gas, sheep farming and ecotourism. On the Argentine side several electronics companies have been established. Ushuaia is home to the small brewing company Cervecería Fueguina, which produces three beers under the Beagle brand name.

See also
 Diego Ramírez Islands
 Karukinka Natural Park
 List of divided islands
 Magallanes and Antártica Chilena Region
 Tierra del Fuego gold rush

Notes

References

External links 
 

 

Atlantic islands of Argentina
Pacific islands of Chile
Islands of Magallanes Region
Landforms of Tierra del Fuego Province, Argentina
International islands
Argentina–Chile border